Nebria composita is a species of ground beetle in the Nebriinae subfamily that can be found in Qinghai and Tibet provinces of China.

Subspecies
The species have 2 subspecies, 1 is found in Qinghai, while the other is endemic to Tibet:
Nebria composita composita Ledoux & Roux, 1993
Nebria composita macra Ledoux & Roux, 2005

References

composita
Beetles described in 1993
Beetles of Asia